Stephan James (born December 16, 1993) is a Canadian actor. After starring in a string of television series as a teenager, he rose to prominence upon winning a Canadian Screen Award for Best Actor for his role as track and field sprinter Jesse Owens in the 2016 film Race.

In 2018, he starred in Barry Jenkins' acclaimed drama film If Beale Street Could Talk, based on the James Baldwin novel of the same name. Also that year, he portrayed Walter Cruz in the Amazon series Homecoming, for which he received a Golden Globe Award nomination.

Early life
James was born in Toronto, Ontario. He graduated from Jarvis Collegiate Institute in 2011. He is the younger brother of actor Shamier Anderson. His family is Jamaican.

Career

Early work 
James got his start in television with a recurring role for two seasons on the long-running Canadian teen series Degrassi. After leaving Degrassi, James played various supporting roles on television, including in How To Be Indie, Clue, and My Babysitter's a Vampire in 2011, and The Listener and The LA Complex in 2012. Also in 2011, he played a supporting role in the ABC Family made-for-TV movie 12 Dates of Christmas.

Later career 
James landed his first major feature film role playing opposite Tatyana Ali and Fefe Dobson in the Canadian film Home Again (2012), in which he played a Jamaican deportee. Although the film received mixed reviews, The Globe and Mail gave James' performance a positive review, calling it "heartbreaking." James garnered a Canadian Screen Award nomination for Best Supporting Actor at the 1st Canadian Screen Awards for his performance, though he ultimately lost to Serge Kanyinda.

In 2013, James was cast as civil rights activist John Lewis in Ava Duvernay's Martin Luther King Jr. film Selma (2014), which went on to be nominated for Best Picture at the Oscars. When asked about the proposed "snubs" the film received from the Academy, James said: To me, I've always seen this film as a victory really, even before I saw the finished version. No award can amount to the way I feel about what we've done with this film. We've done something so relevant to our youth.In 2015, James guest-starred in the CBC television mini-series The Book of Negroes, based on the award-winning novel of the same name by Lawrence Hill. At the 2015 Toronto International Film Festival, James was named one of the industry's foremost "Rising Stars". In celebration of Black History Month, James was named by CBC as one of their '6 Black Canadian Culture-Makers,' citing Oprah Winfrey as one of his biggest influences.

In 2016, James starred in the lead role of African-American track and field sprinter Jesse Owens in the biopic Race (2016) opposite Jason Sudeikis, replacing Star Wars star John Boyega. For his role in Race, James won the Canadian Screen Award for Best Actor.

In 2017, James played DOJ prosecutor Preston Terry in the FOX limited series, Shots Fired. In 2018, he starred in Barry Jenkins' film adaptation of the James Baldwin novel If Beale Street Could Talk, which was nominated for several Academy Awards. Also that year, he portrayed Walter Cruz, opposite Julia Roberts, Bobby Cannavale, and Shea Whigham, in the Amazon series Homecoming. James received a Golden Globe Award nomination for his performance in Homecoming. More recently, he and Shamier Anderson had signed a deal with Boat Rocker. In February 2022, it was reported that James is attached to star and co-produce a limited series about the life of artist Jean-Michel Basquiat.

Nonprofit work
James and his brother, fellow actor Shamier Anderson, founded a non-profit called B.L.A.C.K. Canada (Building a Legacy in Acting, Cinema + Knowledge) in 2016. In December 2020, they announced an extension of the organization called The Black Academy, which showcases Black talent across Canada in the arts, culture, entertainment and sports. James explained, "We're not short of talent but we are short of opportunities. And so we can only hope that The Black Academy will continue to elevate and inspire the Anglophone and Francophone communities to come together and have one place in which they can build on what they've already started and be celebrated and honored for it, rightfully so." The organization's vision includes building a coalition of supporters who can provide funding, mentorship, programming, and awards to support Black excellence in Canada.

Filmography

Film

Television

Awards and nominations

References

External links 
 

1993 births
Living people
Canadian male film actors
Canadian male television actors
Black Canadian male actors
Canadian male child actors
Male actors from Toronto
21st-century Canadian male actors
Canadian people of Jamaican descent
Best Actor Genie and Canadian Screen Award winners